Victoria Curtin Gardner Coates is an American art historian, blogger and political consultant. She served as Senior Advisor to Energy Secretary Dan Brouillette in 2020 and later was appointed to run the Middle East Broadcasting Networks. She served on the United States National Security Council, originally as the Special Assistant to the President and Senior Director for Strategic Assessments before getting promoted to Deputy National Security Advisor upon the nomination of Robert C. O'Brien.

Early life and education
Coates was born and raised in Lancaster, Pennsylvania, where her father, Eugene Herr Gardner, started an investment firm. She is a distant descendant of Andrew Gregg Curtin, who served as Governor of Pennsylvania during the Civil War.

She attended Lancaster Country Day School through 1986. After earning an undergraduate degree at Trinity College, Connecticut, she obtained a master's degree in art history from Williams College in 1992, and a doctorate from the University of Pennsylvania, where she wrote a dissertation on Camillo Massimo. She later taught at the University as an occasional adjunct instructor.

Political career
In the 2000s, she blogged mainly about foreign policy under the pen name "AcademicElephant" at the conservative blog RedState. Her blog posts were read by aides of Secretary of Defense Donald Rumsfeld, who later recruited Coates to work as an advisor for his book, Known and Unknown: A Memoir, published in 2011.

Coates served as an advisor to former Texas governor Rick Perry during his 2012 presidential bid. She became an advisor to Ted Cruz in 2013 and his leading national security advisor during his 2016 presidential campaign.

Her book David's Sling: A History of Democracy in Ten Works of Art was published early in 2016 by Encounter Books. The book covers ten European artists and their major works, including Michelangelo (David), Jacques-Louis David (The Death of Marat), and Picasso (Guernica).

Trump administration 
Coates joined the White House when President Donald Trump took office in 2017 and became one of the President's longest-serving staffers. She was senior director at the National Security Council for the Middle East and North Africa, and in 2019, Robert C. O'Brien promoted her to Deputy National Security Advisor. As deputy, she split her duties with fellow deputy Matthew Pottinger.

In February 2020, it became known that Coates was leaving the White House to become a senior advisor at the Energy Department; the transfer officially occurred a few days later.

As an advisor to the Energy Secretary, Coates was based in Saudi Arabia as Washington struggled to deal with a global oil price crash threatening U.S. energy producers during the COVID-19 pandemic.

In December 2020, Coates was appointed to run the Middle East Broadcasting Networks. In January 2021, she was fired from the position by the acting CEO of U.S. Agency for Global Media, Kelu Chao.

Personal life 
Coates lives with her husband, George G. H. Coates Jr., a wine dealer  and chair of the Commonwealth Foundation for Public Policy Alternatives, with their two children in Chestnut Hill, Philadelphia. They married while she was a student at the University of Pennsylvania.

References 

21st-century American non-fiction writers
American art historians
American bloggers
American political consultants
American women bloggers
American women historians
Lancaster Country Day School alumni
Living people
Ted Cruz
Trinity College (Connecticut) alumni
Trump administration personnel
United States National Security Council staffers
University of Pennsylvania alumni
Williams College alumni
Women art historians
Year of birth missing (living people)
United States Deputy National Security Advisors
21st-century American women writers